Cleisthenes is a genus of righteye flounders native to the northwest Pacific Ocean.

Nomenclature
Both species in the genus are commonly known as Sôhachi in Japan.

Etymology
The genus is named after the Athenian noble and democrat Cleisthenes.

Species
There are currently two recognized species in this genus:
 Cleisthenes herzensteini (Schmidt, 1904)
 Cleisthenes pinetorum Jordan & Starks, 1904

References

Pleuronectidae
Marine fish genera
 
Taxa named by David Starr Jordan
Taxa named by Edwin Chapin Starks